George Arthur Boyd-Rochfort VC (1 January 1880 – 7 August 1940) was an Irish recipient of the Victoria Cross, the highest and most prestigious award for gallantry in the face of the enemy that can be awarded to British and Commonwealth forces.

Early life

Boyd-Rochfort was born on 1 January 1880, the eldest son of Major Rochfort Hamilton Boyd-Rochfort, and the grandson of George Augustus Boyd-Rochfort, both of Middleton Park House, County Westmeath, Ireland.

He was educated at Eton and Trinity College, Cambridge, where he was whip of the Trinity Foot Beagles.

In 1904, he was High Sheriff of Westmeath.

Military career

Boyd-Rochfort was commissioned as a second lieutenant in the Scots Guards in April 1915.

He was 35 years old, and a second lieutenant in the Scots Guards, British Army, (Special Reserve, attached to 1st Battalion) during the First World War when the following deed took place for which he was awarded the VC.

At 2 a.m. on 3 August 1915 in the trenches between Cambrin and La Bassée, France, a German trench-mortar bomb landed on the side of the parapet of the communication trench in which Second Lieutenant Boyd-Rochfort was standing, close to a small working party of his battalion. Instead of stepping back into safety he shouted to his men to look out, rushed at the bomb, seized it and hurled it over the parapet where it at once exploded. This combination of presence of mind and courage saved the lives of many of the working party.

A description of the incident in Boyd-Rochfort's own words:

Boyd-Rochfort relinquished his commission in 1920 with the rank of captain.

Later life
Boyd-Rochfort was a noted jockey and polo-player. After the war he became well known in Irish racing circles as an owner and breeder, and as senior steward of the Irish National Hunt Steeplechase Committee. His brother Cecil Boyd-Rochfort was a noted racehorse trainer.

He died at Dublin on 7 August 1940.

Grave
He was buried in the Church of Ireland graveyard in Castletown Geoghegan, County Westmeath. His memorial was rededicated after refurbishment on 3 August 2015.

The Medal
His Victoria Cross and other medals are displayed at The Guards Regimental Headquarters (Scots Guards RHQ) in Wellington Barracks, London.

References

Listed in order of publication year 
The Register of the Victoria Cross (1981, 1988 and 1997)

Ireland's VCs (Dept of Economic Development, 1995)
Monuments to Courage (David Harvey, 1999)
Irish Winners of the Victoria Cross (Richard Doherty & David Truesdale, 2000)

External links
Location of grave and VC medal (Co. Westmeath, Ireland)

1880 births
1940 deaths
Irish officers in the British Army
People from Castletown Geoghegan
Irish World War I recipients of the Victoria Cross
British Army personnel of World War I
Scots Guards officers
People educated at Eton College
Irish jockeys
British Army recipients of the Victoria Cross
High Sheriffs of County Westmeath
Deputy Lieutenants of Westmeath
Alumni of Trinity College, Cambridge
Irish racehorse owners and breeders